Adalbert Rech (1904 – 1950) was a Romanian footballer who played as a defender.

International career
Adalbert Rech played one game for Romania on 6 May 1928 under coach Constantin Rădulescu in a friendly against Yugoslavia which ended with a 3–1 loss.

References

External links
 

1904 births
1950 deaths
Romanian footballers
Romania international footballers
Place of birth missing
Association football defenders
CSM Reșița players